The  is a streetcar line of Hiroshima Electric Railway (Hiroden) in Hiroshima, Japan. The line has been operated since 1912.

Routes 1, 2, 3, 5, 6, 7 and 8 operate on the line. The line has 20 stations, numbered M1 through M19 (two stations at Kamiyachō are both numbered M9).

Stations

References

See also

Main Line
Railway lines opened in 1912